Foungbesso (also spelled Foungouésso) is a town in western Ivory Coast. It is a sub-prefecture of Touba Department in Bafing Region, Woroba District.

Foungbesso was a commune until March 2012, when it became one of 1126 communes nationwide that were abolished.
In 2014, the population of the sub-prefecture of Foungbesso was 18,033.

Villages
The thirty five villages of the sub-prefecture of Foungbesso and their population in 2014 are

Notes

Sub-prefectures of Bafing Region
Former communes of Ivory Coast